Thopeutis galleriellus is a species of moth in the family Crambidae. It is found in Spain, France, Romania, Ukraine, Russia, North Africa, the Near East, India, Sri Lanka, Iran and Iraq.

References

Moths described in 1892
Haimbachiini
Moths of Europe
Moths of Asia